Bebearia braytoni is a butterfly in the family Nymphalidae. It is found in the Democratic Republic of the Congo (the Beni-Irumu region) and the Central African Republic.

References

Butterflies described in 1907
braytoni